The 1948 NSWRFL season was the forty-first New South Wales Rugby Football League premiership season, Sydney’s top-level rugby league football competition, and Australia’s first. The teams remained unchanged from the previous season, with ten clubs from across the city contesting the premiership during the season which culminated in Western Suburbs’ victory over Balmain in the grand final.

Season summary
When Balmain’s young stars of 1946 and 1947 Pat Devery and Harry Bath left for big money offers in England it seemed doubtful that the Tigers would be able to continue their run of success. However Balmain gave themselves every chance to achieve their third title in a row and made it through to the Grand Final match up against Wests.

Teams 

 Balmain, formed on January 23, 1908, at Balmain Town Hall
 Canterbury-Bankstown
 Eastern Suburbs, formed on January 24, 1908, at Paddington Town Hall
 Manly-Warringah
 Newtown, formed on January 14, 1908
 North Sydney, formed on February 7, 1908
 Parramatta, formed in November 1946
 South Sydney, formed on January 17, 1908, at Redfern Town Hall
 St. George, formed on November 8, 1920, at Kogarah School of Arts
 Western Suburbs, formed on February 4, 1908

Ladder

Finals
In Balmain’s preliminary final match up with St George, Balmain winger Arthur Patton refused to leave the field whilst injured as the Tigers held on to win 13–12.  At game’s end it was found that he had a broken leg.

Grand Final 

After rainy conditions the Grand Final was played on a soft Sydney Sports Ground surface.
The Tigers led the game until the final quarter when a 40-metre run by Wests’ second rower Kevin Hansen saw him tackled right on the tryline. The referee awarded the try and Wests held an 8–5 break until full-time to record their third premiership win.

Western Suburbs Magpies 8 (Tries: Hudson, Hansen. Goals: Keato)

defeated

Balmain Tigers 5 (Tries: Bourke. Goals: Bourke)

Player statistics
The following statistics are as of the conclusion of Round 18.

Top 5 point scorers

Top 5 try scorers

Top 5 goal scorers

References

External links
 Rugby League Tables - Notes AFL Tables
 Rugby League Tables - Season 1948 AFL Tables
 Premiership History and Statistics RL1908
 Finals lineups and results Hunterlink site
 Results: 1941-1950 at rabbitohs.com.au
 1948 Labor Daily Cup at rleague.com
 NSWRFL season 1948 at rugbyleagueproject.org

New South Wales Rugby League premiership
Nswrfl season